Alan Aguirre (born 13 August 1993) is an Argentine footballer who plays as a centre back for Guayaquil City.

References

External links
 

1993 births
Living people
Argentine footballers
Argentina under-20 international footballers
Association football defenders
Boca Juniors footballers
Club Atlético Sarmiento footballers
Club Atlético Douglas Haig players
Ferro Carril Oeste footballers
Instituto footballers
Argentine Primera División players
Primera Nacional players
Argentine people of Basque descent
Footballers from Buenos Aires